Alton Towers is located near the village of Alton in Staffordshire, England. The former country estate was a former seat of the Earls of Shrewsbury. It is now a major theme park in the United Kingdom. In 2012, it attracted 2.4 million visitors, making it the most visited theme park in the United Kingdom and 9th most visited theme park in Europe. It employs in excess of 2,000 staff members during the summer months. 

The area around Alton Towers has seen human habitation for more than a thousand years. Since the Early Medieval Period, the site has been redeveloped several times from fortified encampment to castle and then country house.

Early history 
An Iron Age fort was built on Bunbury Hill ( century BC) which is now occupied by the Alton Towers estate. In about 700 AD, the Saxon king Ceolred of Mercia built a fortress on the hill. King Ine of Wessex besieged the site in 716 AD. The ensuing battle, which ended in stalemate, caused such a loss of life the place was called Slain Hollow (which later became the estate's oriental water garden).

In the late 11th century, Alton Castle was built following the Norman Conquest above the Churnet Valley, in the village of Alton, Staffordshire. By the 12th century, the large manorial estate had been given to knight Bertram II de Verdun (died 1129/30), as a reward for his work in the Crusades. In 1318, the estate passed by marriage to Thomas de Furnival when he married Joan de Verdun. Furnival later died crusading in the Holy Land in 1348. In 1406, Sir John Talbot acquired the estate when he married Maud, the eldest daughter of Thomas de Furnivall, 3rd Baron Furnivall. Talbot became the second created Earl of Shrewsbury in 1442 after the title was forfeited by the third earl of the first creation in 1102. The Norman castle was destroyed during the English Civil War.

In the 17th century, the former castle was redeveloped as a hunting lodge known as Alerton (or Alverton), which is the ancient name for Alton. The three-storey structure reused one of the castle's former towers, which remains part of the present-day building. The lodge was split into two properties, one of which was rented by a tenant. The other half was used by the Talbots as a summer residence, their main residence being at Heythrop Park in Oxfordshire.

Stately home and gardens

In 1801, Charles Talbot, 15th Earl of Shrewsbury, decided that the old hunting lodge was beyond repair, and so decided to commission a Gothic-style country house on his estate on the north side of the Churnet Valley. Over the next 10 years, architects such as Thomas Allason, William Hollins, and Thomas Hopper contributed to the building. A wharf was added to the nearby Uttoxeter Canal to unload construction materials. Work included a drawing room, dining room, chapel, library, long gallery, banqueting hall, conservatory, and entrance hall. As a result, the building was doubled in size. It also included the laying of the foundations for the Flag Tower. The house was renamed Alton Abbey, despite having no particular religious connection.

In 1814, Lord Shrewsbury and his wife moved permanently into their new house at Alton. Work then began on turning the farmland around the house into one of the largest formal gardens in Britain. Several gardens were planted, including a Dutch garden and a rock garden. More than 13,000 trees were also planted in the landscaped parkland. The gardens in the valley leading down to the River Churnet hosted a variety of features. These included a Pagoda fountain which was fed by water from a spring at Ramshorn that passed through various lakes and pools, cast iron Garden Conservatories designed by Robert Abrahams, a "Swiss Cottage" that hosted a Welsh harpist and a copy of Lysicrates' Choragic Monument from Athens.

After the 15th Earl died in 1827, he was succeeded by his nephew John, 16th Earl of Shrewsbury, who completed the gardens and house started by his uncle. In 1831, the Shrewsburys' principal residence in Heythrop burned down. The 16th earl then came to live at Alton permanently, bringing everything that could be saved from Heythrop. Noted architect Augustus Pugin designed a new entrance hall, banqueting hall and various other rooms, extending the house further. The property was renamed Alton Towers. From 1839, the grounds were opened to the public at various times of the year.

In 1852, following the death of the 16th Earl, Alton Towers was briefly inherited by his cousin, Bertram, 17th Earl of Shrewsbury but when he died four years later at the young age of 24, all work on the house ceased and no further alterations would again be made to the property by his family. As there was no direct heir to the estate, Bertram left the earldom and Alton Towers to a younger son of The 14th Duke of Norfolk but this was contested by Henry, 18th Earl of Shrewsbury, of Ingestre Hall, a distant cousin of the late 17th earl, who filed a legal writ to determine lawful ownership of Alton Towers. As the contents of the house were not contested, everything within the house was auctioned off in a 29-day sale of 4,000 lots.

In 1857, The 18th Earl of Shrewsbury succeeded to the earldom, and two years later he acquired the Alton Towers Estate. In celebration, the earl held a procession through Staffordshire on 13 April 1860. Beginning in Uttoxeter, it stretched over a mile with up to 40,000 people in the grounds of Alton Towers at the end. The Chetwynd-Talbots' main home was Ingestre Hall and they only lived at Alton Towers while Ingestre was being rebuilt following a fire. The 19th Earl opened the grounds to the public at certain times of the year to help raise money to refurbish parts of the house.

During the 1890s, The 20th Earl of Shrewsbury started the tradition of summer fetes at Alton. As well as the gardens, people were attracted with fireworks displays, balloon festivals, clowns, and exhibitions of instruments of torture. In 1896, the earl and countess separated. The earl went to live at Ingestre and the countess stayed at Alton. The house began to decay and the grounds became neglected because the earl did not pay for upkeep. The 20th earl was a very active businessman who is now best known for founding the manufacturer of Talbot cars in 1902. In November 1918, the earl decided to sell off the majority of the estate by auction. The countess continued to live on the estate for another two years after the earl died in 1921.

Public ownership
In 1924, the remaining part of the estate and house was sold to a group of local businessmen, who formed Alton Towers Limited. Although the contents of the house were sold off, the grounds were restored and remained open to the public. Parts of the house were converted into cafés and toilets for public use.

During the Second World War, Alton Towers was requisitioned by the War Office as an officer training unit. The gardens remained closed to the public until 1951. It is a common misconception that military occupation of the towers caused a lot of damage to the building. However, this is not the case, as much of the building was already boarded up and unused. It is now commonly understood that the decay was caused in the inter-war period by the Bagshaw family – the majority shareholders – who sold the wood and plaster fixtures from the house's interiors as well as the lead roofing, allowing water to rot the building's remaining fittings. The house was left a denuded shell.

Theme park

In the 1950s, parts of the grounds were partially reopened to the public by the Alton Towers Limited company. A 2 foot gauge miniature railway was opened in the grounds (closed 1997). Four years later, an indoor model railway, which had taken nearly three years to build, was opened in the chapel entrance. Visitors were required to pay a separate admission charge to view the attraction. The railway had 35 locomotives which hauled more than 200 items of rolling stock. During its history, the layout featured various trains representing examples from British railways, Italian electric trains with pantographs and Canadian Pacific Railways. Marketing literature often claimed the model layout was "the largest of its kind in the world". In 1993, the chapel was restored and the railway was removed and sold at auction.

During the 1960s and 1970s, the grounds were redeveloped as a visitor attraction. There was a boating lake, a chairlift, and a small fair behind the ruins of the main house. Concrete floors were installed in Alton Towers house so that it could be opened to the public. The building was listed as Grade II.

After millionaire property developer John Broome married the daughter of majority shareholder Denis Bagshaw in 1973, he bought out the controlling stake in Alton Towers. Over the next few years, he laid the foundation for the modern theme park by installing various permanent rides and developing areas of the grounds in progressive stages. In 1978, the newly restored sunken gardens featured in a series of 30-second TV commercials for Accurist starring John Cleese.

Alton Towers began its evolution into a major theme park in 1980 with the installation of The Corkscrew rollercoaster, the Pirate Ship, and the Alpine Bobsled ride. In 1981, Talbot Street, the park's first permanent themed area, was opened on the site of the old fairground behind the Towers, as well as the Log Flume constructed near to the boating lake. In 1984, the park's second roller-coaster, The Black Hole, arrived. Throughout the next decade, more attractions, areas and rides were added to Alton Towers.

In 1990, the park was purchased by The Tussauds Group. The change of ownership heralded an era of intense development, with a range of large attractions and new areas being built at the park, including the dark rides The Haunted House (1992) and Toyland Tours (1994), thrill rides such as Nemesis (1994), a hotel complex in 1996, Oblivion (1998), and Air (now known as Galactica) (2002).

In 2005, Alton Towers was acquired by the investment group Dubai International Capital (DIC) when it purchased Tussauds for £800 million. The Tussauds Group was bought by Merlin Entertainments in March 2007 for over £1 billion from DIC, placing Alton Towers under their control. In July 2007, the resort and park was sold to Nick Leslau and his investment firm Prestbury, who now lease the park back to Merlin Entertainments to operate on a 35-year lease.

See also
 Listed buildings in Farley, Staffordshire
 Augustus Pugin
 Earls of Shrewsbury

References

Merlin Entertainments Group
Gardens in Staffordshire
Tourist attractions in Staffordshire
Gothic Revival architecture in Staffordshire
1860 establishments in England
Amusement parks in England
Country houses in Staffordshire
British country houses destroyed in the 20th century
Alton Towers
Alton Towers